Wilson, in the English county of Leicestershire, is a small hamlet just outside Melbourne, Derbyshire.  Close to East Midlands Airport, Wilson retains many 'village-like' features.  It has one pub, the Bulls Head. Wilson has no amenities other than a golf course, gym and swimming pool.
Its name is first recorded in the 12th century as Wiuelestunia and likely came from Anglo-Saxon Wifeles tūn = "Wifel's farmstead or village". In 1870-72 it had a population of 177.

It closed in June 1871.

Governance
Wilson is part of the civil parish of Breedon on the Hill  and the non-metropolitan district of North West Leicestershire.

References

External links 

Hamlets in Leicestershire
North West Leicestershire District